Rudbar-e Deh Sar (also Romanized as Rūdbār-e Deh Sar) is a village in Kojid Rural District, Rankuh District, Amlash County, Gilan Province, Iran. At the 2006 census, its population was 30, in 11 families.

References 

Populated places in Amlash County